Scutiger adungensis is a species of frog in the family Megophryidae. It is only known with certainty from two specimens collected in 1931 from Adung Valley in northern Myanmar, near the border to Tibet; there are more recent unconfirmed sightings. Common name Adung lazy toad has been coined for it.

Description
The head is as broad as it is wide and relatively flat. The snout is rounded. Tympanum is absent. Lateral parotoid glands are present. The limbs are relatively short; the fingers and toes have no webbing. Skin in the upper parts of the body bears pustules, while the limbs are granular. The upper parts are dark, with a darker triangular area between the eyes pointing backward. The lower parts are lighter and without pattern.

Habitat and conservation
There are also more recent sightings from the Hkakabo Razi National Park, but no specimens have been collected.

References

adungensis
Amphibians of Myanmar
Endemic fauna of Myanmar
Amphibians described in 1979
Taxonomy articles created by Polbot